Boulton Market, also spelled as Bolton Market, is a wholesale market located in Saddar, Karachi, Pakistan.

History
It was built in 1883 British India as a fruit and vegetable market and was named after C.F. Boulton, then municipal commissioner of Karachi. In 1886, the size of the market was expanded in order to accommodate stalls of meat and fish.

References

Bazaars in Karachi
1883 establishments in British India
Saddar Town
Tourist attractions in Karachi